VAX Killer was a marketing phrase used to describe two of IBM's families of computers that were competing with Digital Equipment Corporation's VAX line of minicomputers. Neither of IBM's families was compatible with the other. By contrast, VAX computers, manufactured by DEC, then the second largest company in the industry, were compatible with one another. The New York Times wrote that IBM "appears to be slaying precious few Vaxes."

Computerworld reported in January 1988 that IBM was "backing away from" using the term. At that point, one product line was clearly not killing VAXen and the other hadn't yet had a chance at doing so. Eight months later another periodical wrote: "IBM has been busy this year protecting itself with one VAX killer after another."

History
IBM's 9370 was a smaller mainframe, compatible with larger IBM 370 mainframes. IBM's AS/400, also known as Silverlake, merged two similar-with-one-another families of computers, the System/36 and the System/38. The result was DEC had one compatible family, whereas IBM had two incompatible families: one a mainframe-compatible system, the other a mid-range system. At the time, IBM's mid-range market share was not more than 17 percent; DEC's was double.

The IBM 9370 was a low-end system announced October 7, 1986, and it met its two design goals: to be compatible with larger IBM 370s, and to be "small enough and quiet enough to operate in an office environment." It failed with the bolted-on third goal of being a VAX-killer. As for the second line of VAX-killers, The Chicago Tribune quoted a major research firm's summary: "The Silverlake products should help IBM cover for the disaster of the 9370."

One move DEC made to counter the 9370's going small was to go even smaller, by introducing two additional models to its line of MicroVAX systems.

Work on the second VAX Killer concept began earlier than the 9370, but the AS/400's designer said "I never saw it as a VAX killer."

A 2020 lookback at the development of the Data General minicomputer described in Tracy Kidder's The Soul of a New Machine notes that it was really Data General's second try at building a "VAX Killer." An earlier look at the phrase had DEC's VAX/VMS as the Unix killer: VMS replacing parts of IBM/Unisys/HP shops where, one writer claimed, Unix might otherwise have entered.

References

DEC minicomputers
History of computing hardware
History of software
IBM minicomputers
Marketing